Tinchuda is a rural locality (a selo) in Nachadinsky Selsoviet, Tlyaratinsky District, Republic of Dagestan, Russia. The population was 211 as of 2010.

Geography 
Tinchuda is located 31 km northeast of Tlyarata (the district's administrative centre) by road. Nachada is the nearest rural locality.

References 

Rural localities in Tlyaratinsky District